Nikhil Goyal is an American sociologist. He has previously taught as an adjunct professor in New York University's Prison Education program. He is the author of Schools on Trial, which was published by Doubleday, an imprint of Random House, in 2016, and has written for The Wall Street Journal, Washington Post, The Nation, and other publications.

Goyal holds a M.Phil in Education from the University of Cambridge, where he is currently a PhD candidate.

Bibliography

Book

Selected articles
Goyal, Nikhil. "Why banning ‘meal shaming’ isn’t enough." Washington Post. May 29, 2019. 
Goyal, Nikhil. "These Politicians Think Your Kids Need High-Stakes Testing—but Not Theirs." The Nation. March 29, 2016.
Goyal, Nikhil. "Solutions for Stressed-Out High-School Students." Wall Street Journal. February 12, 2016.

References

External links
 

Living people
American education writers
1995 births